The 2014 NCAA Division II Football Championship Game was a postseason college football game that determined a national champion in NCAA Division II for the 2014 season. It was played at Sporting Park in Kansas City, Kansas, on December 20, 2014, with kickoff at 4:00 p.m. EST (3:00 p.m. local CST), and television coverage on ESPN2.

Teams
The participants of the 2014 NCAA Division II Football Championship Game were the finalists of the 2014 Division II Playoffs, which began with teams seeded 3–6 in each super region playing in the first round, the winners of which faced teams seeded 1–2 in the second round. From there, the bracket was a sixteen-team single-elimination tournament. The game featured the No. 2 seed CSU–Pueblo and No. 2 seed Minnesota State. This was the first meeting between the teams and both teams' first championship game appearance.

National semifinals

Game summary

Statistics

References

Championship Game
NCAA Division II Football Championship Games
CSU Pueblo ThunderWolves football games
Minnesota State Mavericks football games
American football in Kansas
NCAA Division II Football Championship Game
NCAA Division II Football Championship Game